The 2002 Romania rugby union tour of British Isles was a series of matches played in September and November 2002 in Ireland, Scotland and Wales by the Romania national rugby union team. It was a tour in two phases with the first match in September against Ireland, and the remaining three matches in Wales and Scotland during November. After the Irish match Romania played two qualification matches for 2003 Rugby World Cup against Italy and Spain.

First test: Ireland 

Ireland:15.Girvan Dempsey, 14.John Kelly, 13.Brian O'Driscoll, 12.Kevin Maggs, 11.Denis Hickie, 10.Ronan O'Gara, 9.Peter Stringer, 8.Anthony Foley (capt.), 7.Keith Gleeson, 6.Simon Easterby, 5.Malcolm O'Kelly, 4.Gary Longwell, 3.John Hayes, 2.Shane Byrne, 1.Reggie Corrigan  – replacements: 18.Leo Cullen, 19.Victor Costello, 20.Guy Easterby – No entry : 16.Paul Shields, 17.Paul Wallace 
Romania:15.Gabriel Brezoianu, 14.Cristian Sauan, 13.Valentin Maftei, 12.Romeo Gontineac (c), 11.Mihai Vioreanu, 10.Ionut Tofan, 9.Lucian Sirbu, 8.Alin Petrache , 7.Alex Manta, 6.George Chiriac, 5.Cristian Petre, 4.Marius Dragomir, 3.Marius Tincu , 2.Razvan Mavrodin, 1.Mihai Dumitru, – replacements: 16.Marius Picoiu, 17.Roland Vusec, 18.Petrisor Toderasc, 19.Dan Tudosa, 20.Augustin Petrechei – No entry:

Second Test : Wales 

Wales:15.Rhys Williams, 14.Mark Jones, 13.Tom Shanklin, 12.Sonny Parker, 11.Gareth Thomas, 10.Neil Jenkins, 9.Dwayne Peel, 8.Scott Quinnell, 7.Colin Charvis, 6.Michael Owen, 5.Steve Williams, 4.Robert Sidoli, 3.Martyn Madden, 2.Mefin Davies, 1.Gethin Jenkins – replacements: 16.Andrew Lewis, 17.Ben Evans, 18.Gareth Llewellyn, 19.Gavin Thomas – No entry : 20.Ryan Powell 
Romania:15.Dan Dumbrava, 14.Vasile Ghioc, 13.Gabriel Brezoianu, 12.Romeo Gontineac (c), 11.Marius Picoiu, 10.Ionut Tofan, 9.Petre Mitu, 8.Ovidiu Tonita, 7.Alin Petrache , 6.Florin Corodeanu, 5.Cristian Petre, 4.Sorin Socol, 3.Silviu Florea, 2.Razvan Mavrodin, 1.Petrisor Toderasc, – replacements: 16.Nicolae Dragos Dima, 17.Marian Constantin, 18.Marcel Socaciu, 19.George Chiriac – No entry: 20.Cristian Podea

Mid week game against "Scotland A"

Third Test : Scotland 

Scotland:15.Stuart Moffat, 14.Nikki Walker, 13.Andy Craig, 12.Brendan Laney, 11.Chris Paterson, 10.Gordon Ross, 9.Bryan Redpath (cap), 8.Simon Taylor, 7.Budge Pountney, 6.Martin Leslie, 5.Stuart Grimes, 4.Scott Murray, 3.Bruce Douglas, 2.Gordon Bulloch, 1.Tom Smith – replacements: Steve Scott, Matthew Stewart, Nathan Hines, Jon Petrie – No entry : Graeme Beveridge 
Romania:15.Gabriel Brezoianu, 14.Ion Teodorescu, 13.Valentin Maftei, 12.Romeo Gontineac (cap), 11.Vasile Ghioc, 10.Ionut Tofan, 9.Petre Mitu, 8.Alin Petrache, 7.George Chiriac, 6.Florin Corodeanu, 5.Cristian Petre, 4.Augustin Petrechei, 3.Nicolae Dragos Dima, 2.Marius Tincu, 1.Petru Balan, – replacements: Petrisor Toderasc, Marcel Socaciu, Stefan Dragnea, Costica Mersoiu – No entry: Cristian Podea

References 

 

2002 rugby union tours
tour
2002
2002–03 in British rugby union
2002–03 in Irish rugby union
2002–03 in Welsh rugby union
2002–03 in Scottish rugby union
Rugby union tours of Ireland
Rugby union tours of Scotland
Rugby union tours of Wales